Avdeyevka is a rural locality (a village) and the administrative center of Derevnya Avdeyevka Rural Settlement of Khvastovichsky District, Kaluga Oblast, Russia. The population was 116 as of 2010. There are 4 streets.

Geography 
Avdeyevka is located 27 km southwest of Khvastovichi (the district's administrative centre) by road. Guda is the nearest rural locality.

References 

Rural localities in Kaluga Oblast